The Volvo S40 is a series of compact and mid-size automobiles marketed and produced by the Swedish manufacturer Volvo Cars from 1995 to 2012, offered as a more mainstream alternative to the Volvo S60 to compete in a lower pricing bracket. The S40 was more or less positioned against premium-leaning small family cars like the Volkswagen Jetta as well as some mass-market large family cars.

The first generation (1995–2004) was introduced in 1995 with the S40 (S from saloon) and V40 (V from versatility, estate) cars.

The second generation (2004–2012) was released in 2004, and the estate variant's name changed to V50.

The range was replaced by the Volvo V40 five door hatchback in 2012.


First generation (1995–2004) 

During August 1995, Volvo released its new series, with the intention of calling the cars S4 and F4. However, as Audi had already reserved the "S4" name, Volvo opted to name the range S40 (saloon), and V40 (estate). These cars were manufactured at the Nedcar factory at Born in the Netherlands (a pre Ford joint venture between Volvo and Mitsubishi Motors) and based on a common platform with the Mitsubishi Carisma, later used by the Proton Waja.  They were also the last Volvos to be produced at the Born plant; a lineage that had begun in the early 1970s with Volvo's collaboration with DAF that had led to the Volvo 66 and the Volvo 300 series.

In the United Kingdom, it cost approximately 50% more than the related Mitsubishi Carisma. The car helped change perceptions of Volvo: "The S40/V40 range was the car that finally persuaded buyers that Volvo really could build a credible compact executive car", reported the RAC. For the 2000 model year, Volvo expanded the S40/V40's market to North America, where went on sale exclusively with the 1.9 liter turbo.

The V40, with a drag coefficient of 0.32, was the first whole model to be introduced under the direction of the British designer Peter Horbury, Volvo’s design director, and was marketed in Australia, South America and the Far East. The V40 was named the ‘Most Beautiful Estate Car in the World’ at an Italian award ceremony. The official premiere was at the Frankfurt Motor Show, in September 1995, with the V40 premièring in December 1995, at the Bologna Motor Show.

In July 2000, Volvo updated the 40 Series ("Phase II"), implementing a number of technical improvements, including improved engine management, diesel direct fuel injection, extra safety features, larger brake discs, new front suspension and steering, revised rear suspension, larger tyres and a wider track.

A minor facelift gave more streamlining, slightly different front wings and front bumper, and larger front indicators, as well as minor instruments and fascia re design.

The 40 Series cars were equipped with four-cylinder engines, such as a 1.9 turbo diesel or 1.6 (1588 cc), 1.8 (1731 cc, later increased to 1783cc), 2.0T (1948 cc), 1.9 T4 (1855 cc, later increased to 1948cc) or 2.0 (1948 cc) fuel injected gasoline engines all of which are derivatives of the Volvo Modular engine series that started life in the Volvo 960 and carried in both 5 and 6 cyl formats in Volvo's bigger FWD cars.

There was also a 1.8 L (1834 cc) petrol direct injection engine provided by Mitsubishi as part of the platform sharing between the 40 series and the Carisma. The Volvo S40/V40 series was a completely new car from the ground up, only one engine – the 1.9 turbo diesel – carried over from the old 400 Series.

The low (2.0T) and high (1.9 T4) pressure turbo variants were positioned at the top of the motor range. The 2.0T was rounded down and badged as 1.9T and was the only engine available in North America. The five speed manual transmission, widely available in Europe, was not certified in North American S40s, with the five speed automatic as the only option. No electric CVT was planned, unlike the 440 HTA / High Tech Auto CVT that had been released before the 400 series was completely phased out.

In the United Kingdom, trim levels were S, XS, SE and CD. Later on, trim levels offered were supplemented with SE Lux and Sport Lux trim designations. A limited edition 'Xi' trim level was also offered for a short run on Phase 1 and Phase 1.5 cars, often painted yellow with black bezel headlamps.

The Volvo S40 was the first car to earn a four star Euro-NCAP safety rating.

Engines

Sales

S40

V40 sales

Total Produced 423,491

Motorsport

The S40 was homologated for racing in the Super Touring category on 1 January 1997. It competed in the British Touring Car Championship with Tom Walkinshaw Racing between 1997 and 1999 with Rickard Rydell winning the 1998 title. In Australia, Rickard Rydell and Jim Richards won the 1998 AMP Bathurst 1000. The S40 also competed in the Australian Super Touring Championship with Volvo Dealer Racing in 1998 and 1999, with Volvo winning the Manufacturers Championship in its second year. It also competed in the Swedish Touring Car Championship and the 2003 Norwegian Touring Car Championship.

Second generation (2004–2012) 
For the wagon variant, see Volvo V50, for convertible variant, see Volvo C70, for hatchback, see Volvo C30

Introduced in the beginning of 2004, the second generation S40 (known as the 2004.5 Volvo S40) introduced a new design based on the Volvo P1 platform built at the Volvo Cars factory in Ghent, Belgium. At the same time, the V40 was replaced by the estate V50, also based on the P1 platform and built in Ghent.

The S40 was nominated for the World Car of the Year award for 2005, and won the Canadian Car of the Year Best New Sport Compact award for 2005. It was also elected the South African Car of the Year for 2005 by the South African Guild of Motoring Journalists.

The chassis for this car and the majority of its components were developed by Volvo, however similar mechanical components can be found in the Mazda3 and the European Ford Focus. It had the latest generation of Volvo's modular five cylinder engines.

The inline fives were frequently improved upon by Volvo since the engine's debut in 1991 for the 1992 model year Volvo 850. The top-of-the-line S40/V50 T5 AWD, as well as the 2.4 and 2.4i, powertrain is still made by Volvo. The transmission is developed with Getrag at Volvo's Koping Transmission Center in Sweden, and the AWD system bought from Haldex Traction of Sweden.

The S40/V50 T5 (one of the several variants) features the 2.5 L B5254T3 (later B5254T7) (2521 cc) five-cylinder fuel-injected engine with a light pressure turbocharger. The valvetrain has four valves per cylinder and is a DOHC design.

The engine is transversely mounted at the front of the vehicle and was available with the M66W (front wheel drive) or M66C (all wheel drive) drivetrains. In the United States, the manual (six speed) transmission was only available on the V50 in 2006, 2007 and 2010 and only with AWD and R-line trim.

The initial 2.0 diesel engine was the DW10, produced by PSA. A new range of engines and transmissions were introduced at the end of May 2010 (see "engine specifications" below).

There was also 1.8 L (Mazda L engine) petrol version available in the European markets.

Marketing 
Volvo launched an advertising campaign for the S40 titled The Mystery of Dalarö, using a documentary style video approach. The eight minute film was credited to fictitious Venezuelan film maker Carlos Soto. In fact, as was disclosed later, it was directed by Spike Jonze.

The film is set on 25 October 2003, where 32 people supposedly purchased a Volvo S40, at the same local Volvo dealership in Dalarö, a small village to the south east of Stockholm. In addition to this film, a four minute documentary of the documentary, calling into question the validity of the events, was posted as Soto's "personal edit" on his alleged homepage.

The S40 was the first Volvo car to be launched in China by the brand under the Changan Ford joint venture and commenced production in March 2006. Engines choices consisted of the 2.0, 2.4 and 2.5 litre petrol engines paired with either a 5 speed manual or 6 speed dual clutch gearbox.

Facelift

The S40 was refreshed for April 2007. Improvements include improved audio systems, increased storage space and new safety features like emergency brake lights which flash rapidly during hard braking to alert traffic behind the car. The new S40 also comes with optional active bi xenon headlights which point the light beam in the direction of the road as it curves (standard in SE Lux models).

There was also an optional BLIS (blind spot information system) camera located on the side mirrors which alerts the driver of passing vehicles beside the car.

Volvo released the 2.0 litre diesel Powershift on the third week of February 2008, except in Ireland, where it was released in the last week of May, because of delivery intervals.

The D5 engine became available with a manual gearbox offering  of torque and an automatic transmission offering  in the second half of 2007.

The model of 2009 saw rear end boot lid changes, with wider spacing of the 'Volvo' lettering and larger characters, as in the newer Volvo models.

In 2010, the new, larger, circular Volvo logo appeared on the front grille, in the United States, a manual transmission was briefly available with the T5 AWD version. In North America, the naturally aspirated five cylinder engine, all wheel drive, and manual transmission were all dropped for the model year of 2011, leaving only the automatic, front wheel drive T5 in base and R-Design trims. The model year of 2011 was the last for the S40 in the United States and Canada.

Engine specifications (2011)
From the end of May 2010, a new range of engines were available for the so called "2011 model".

The range now included three petrol engines (1.6, 2.0 and T5, the latter only available with front-wheel drive and automatic transmission), four diesel engines (the existing DRIVe and the new D2, D3 and D4) and the 2.0F flexible-fuel engine that can run either on normal petrol or E85, an ethanol petrol mixture. Production ended in May 2012.

The updated 2.0 and T5 and the new D2, D3 and D4 are compliant with the Euro 5 emission standard (the rest are Euro 4 compliant), and the DRIVe included a start-stop system for reduced fuel consumption and emissions. New six speed gearboxes are used in the D2 (manual: B6 D2), D3 and D4 (manual: M66D, automatic: Aisin AWF21).

(*) Available from September 2010

Note updated: In 2012 the last variant of the S40 2.0 Comfort, was the same 2.0 Petrol Engine, but with a PowerShift 6 speed automatic transmition. Adding to this, was a little differences in headlights and tile lights.

S40 sales 

Total produced: 602,910 (1995–2012)

See also
Volvo V50, estate variant of the second generation
Volvo C30, three door hatchback bearing the same design as the second generation
Volvo C70, coupé and convertible version of both the first and the second generation
Volvo S70, mid size car bearing a similar front end design with the first generation

Notes

References

External links

All-wheel-drive vehicles
Cars introduced in 1995
Cars introduced in 2004
Cars of the Netherlands
Compact cars
Euro NCAP large family cars
Ford C1 platform
Front-wheel-drive vehicles
Partial zero-emissions vehicles
Cars powered by transverse 4-cylinder engines
Sedans
Station wagons
Touring cars
VDL Nedcar vehicles
S40
2010s cars